Kasserine Governorate, sometimes spelt Casrein, is one of the twenty-four governorates (provinces) of Tunisia. It is in west-central Tunisia on the frontier with Algeria, wholly north of the true centre line but the area is south or west of the bulk of the population of the country, based on Tunisia's greater northern rainfall. It covers an area of 8,260 km2 and has a population of 465,000 (2022).The capital is Kasserine which is at the foot of Jebel ech Chambi, Tunisia's highest mountain, in turn part of the Dorsal Atlas mountains.  The mountain and its associated escarpment form its own national park in the province.

Main sights
In Kasserine Governorate exists two of the most famous Roman sites in Tunisia, which are Sbeitla and Haidra. The Triumphal Arch of the Tetrarchy at the entrance to Sbeitla commemorates the four emperors that governed the empire in the year 300, just before the rule of Constantine I.

Administrative divisions

Governors
Below the list of governors of Kasserine since its creation:

Sports 
Kasserine Governorate's most popular sport clubs are the Union Sportif of Sbeitla and AS Kasserine.

References

 
Governorates of Tunisia